The Utah Golden Spikers was an American soccer club based in Salt Lake City, Utah that was a member of the American Soccer League. The team became the Utah Pioneers, a new franchise with new owners, during the latter stages of their only season, after the Golden Spikers were ousted from the league for nonpayment of their financial obligations.

They were coached by former Olympiakos of Greece player, Nick Kambolis.

Year-by-year
After challenging the eventual ASL champion Los Angeles Skyhawks for the Western Division title through most of the 1976 season, Utah faded late and finished 3rd. They lost in the playoff quarterfinals to the Tacoma Tides by a score of 2–1.

1976 Roster
 Dee Benson
 Tony Douglas (1976) 17 Apps 7 Goals
 Peter Thomas (1976) 20 Apps
 Terry Weekes
George Kossmann Defender (1976)
Cres McTavish

References

Soccer clubs in Salt Lake City
Defunct soccer clubs in Utah
American Soccer League (1933–1983) teams
1976 establishments in Utah
1976 disestablishments in Utah
Soccer clubs in Utah
Association football clubs established in 1976
Association football clubs disestablished in 1976